Kaloula is a genus of microhylid frogs found in southern and eastern Asia. They are sometimes known as the Asian narrowmouth toads.

Species
The genus currently has at least 19 species. Some sources also recognize Kaloula macrocephala Bourret, 1942 as a valid species, whereas the Amphibian Species of the World treats it as a synonym of Kaloula pulchra. 5 new species have been described since 2000, and there are unnamed species yet to be described.

Kaloula pulchra, Kaloula picta, and Kaloula borealis are the most widespread and commonly found varieties, often living near human settlements.

Blackburn, et al. (2013) lists several Kaloula varieties that are likely to be new, previously undescribed  species.
Kaloula sp. nov. Palawan: Closely related to Kaloula baleata. Recorded in Palawan.
Kaloula sp. nov. Sulawesi: Closely related to Kaloula baleata. Recorded in the Togian Islands (Batudaka Island), Central Sulawesi, and North Sulawesi (Bogani Nani Wartabone National Park).
Kaloula sp. nov. Sibuyan: Closely related to Kaloula conjuncta. Recorded on Sibuyan Island and Mount Baloy, Panay.
Kaloula sp. nov. Samar & Leyte: Related to Kaloula conjuncta and Kaloula picta. Recorded in Taft, Eastern Samar, and Danao and Baybay in Leyte.
Kaloula sp. nov. Panay: Related to Kaloula kalingensis and Kaloula kokacii. Recorded in Sibalom, Antique Province, Panay.
Kaloula sp. nov. East Luzon: Related to Kaloula kalingensis and Kaloula kokacii. Recorded on Mount Makiling, Sierra Madres, and Aurora Memorial National Park.

Phylogeny
A molecular phylogenetic study by Mo et al. (2013) suggests that the only four Kaloula species found in China, namely Kaloula borealis, Kaloula nonggangensis, Kaloula rugifera, and Kaloula verrucosa, belong to a monophyletic group, termed the K. verrucosa group.

Blackburn, et al. (2013) consider Kaloula species endemic to the Philippines to form a monophyletic group, containing the species Kaloula walteri, Kaloula rigida, Kaloula conjuncta, Kaloula picta, Kaloula kalingensis, and Kaloula kokacii. Kaloula likely colonized the Philippines from Southeast Asia during the Late Miocene, and then radiated into different ecotypes. K. kalingensis and K. kokacii occupy niches as arboreal tree-hole frogs in northern and southern Luzon respectively, while K. rigida and K. walteri are ground frogs in northern and southern Luzon respectively. K. picta, which is a terrestrial ground frog, and K. conjuncta, which is scansorial (climbing) and prefers shrubs, have established themselves throughout the Philippine archipelago. K. picta as well as K. pulchra display the lowest internal genetic diversity, but also have widespread geographical distributions that may have likely occurred be due to human activity.

Excluding Kaloula taprobanica, the most recent common ancestor of Kaloula likely existed about 22.3 million years ago, around the Oligocene–Miocene boundary. The most recent common ancestor of the terrestrial species K. rigida and K. walteri likely lived 4.8 million years ago during the Early Pliocene, while that of the arboreal species K. kalingensis and K. kokacii likely lived 9.1 million years ago. The most recent common ancestor of K. conjuncta, which currently has four recognized subspecies, likely lived 4.4 million years ago.

Blackburn, et al. (2013) suggests that Kaloula taprobanica might not form a clade with the other Kaloula species, although it does clearly form a clade with Metaphrynella, Ramanella, and the rest of Kaloula.

Other studies relating to Kaloula phylogeny include van Bocxlaer et al. (2007), Matsui et al. (2011), and Trueb et al. (2011).

The following phylogeny has been adapted from Blackburn, et al. (2013). Kaloula assamensis, Kaloula taprobanica, and Kaloula aureata have not been included.

References

External links

AmphibiaWeb

 
Microhylidae
Amphibians of Asia
Amphibian genera
Taxa named by John Edward Gray